Osmia aeruginosa is a species of bee in the family Megachilidae and the genus Osmia. it is found in northern Fars province of iran

References 

Fauna of Iran
aeruginosa
Insects described in 1988